Glaucocharis castaneus is a moth in the family Crambidae. It was described by Tie-Mei Chen, Shi-Mei Song, De-Cheng Yuan and Guang-Xue Zhang in 2004. It is found in Guangxi, China.

References

Diptychophorini
Moths described in 2004